Sidney Gottlieb (August 3, 1918 – March 7, 1999) was an American chemist and spymaster who headed the Central Intelligence Agency's 1950s and 1960s assassination attempts and mind-control program, known as Project MKUltra.

Early years and education
Gottlieb was born to Hungarian Jewish immigrant parents Fanny and Louis Gottlieb in the Bronx on August 3, 1918. His older brother was plant biologist David Gottlieb. A stutterer since childhood, he earned a master's degree in speech therapy from San Jose State University after retiring from the CIA. He was born with a club foot, which got him rejected from military service in World War II but did not prevent his pursuit of folk dancing, a lifelong passion.

Gottlieb graduated from James Monroe High School in 1936, and enrolled in the free City College in NYC. He decided to transfer to a school that offered a legitimate agricultural biology course, and wished to attend the University of Wisconsin. In order to take the specialized courses he wished to have, he first attended Arkansas Tech University, where he studied botany, organic chemistry, and principles of dairying. His success at ATU won him admission to the University of Wisconsin, where he was mentored by Ira Baldwin, the assistant dean of the College of Agriculture. Gottlieb graduated magna cum laude in 1940. His accomplishments at the university, paired with a glowing recommendation from Baldwin, won him admission to the California Institute of Technology, where he received his Doctorate in Biochemistry in June 1943, writing his thesis on "Studies of Ascorbic Acid in Cowpeas."

Gottlieb met his wife Margaret Moore, daughter of a Presbyterian missionary, while attending CIT, and they swiftly married. Denied the chance at military service, he sought out another way to serve, and began looking for government work in Washington. By 1948, his wife and two daughters were living in a remote cabin near Vienna, Virginia, that had no electricity or running water. He was living here when he began working for the Central Intelligence Agency (CIA), and his lifestyle was a stark contrast to that of the Ivy League men normally recruited at CIA.

Government career 

Gottlieb's first government position was at the Department of Agriculture, where he researched the chemical structure of organic soils. He later transferred to the Food and Drug Administration, where he developed tests to measure the presences of drugs in the human body. Gottlieb grew bored of this work and sought a more challenging position. In 1948, he found a job at the National Research Council, where he described being "exposed to some interesting work concerning ergot alkaloids as vasoconstrictors and hallucinogens." He soon relocated to the University of Maryland as a research associate dedicated to studying metabolisms of fungi.

On July 13, 1951, Gottlieb had his first day of work at the CIA. Then-Deputy Director for Plans Allen Dulles hired him on Ira Baldwin's recommendation. Baldwin had founded and run the biowarfare program at Fort Detrick years earlier, and had kept Gottlieb in his orbit throughout the years. Gottlieb, who had advanced knowledge of poisons, was making his entrance in the early years of the Cold War. In the years after World War II, American paranoia about infiltrating Communist ideology whipped the country into a nationalistic fervor to protect American cultural and political dominance from a supposed impending Soviet takeover. This also contributed to the CIA rapidly expanding its experimental methods and tactics over the next two decades, in an effort to break down and rebuild the human mind to work in its favor, falsely believing the USSR and The People's Republic of China had already mastered brainwashing and were using it against their own citizens and prisoners. This belief drove the early OSS and CIA and their forays into mind control operations and led to justifications of countless horrific acts, often with no oversight or accountability. 

Project BLUEBIRD was already under way when Gottlieb was brought on board; it experimented with "Special Interrogation" techniques on captured prisoners overseas at black sites like Camp King, Fort Clayton, and Villa Schuster, using drugs to attempt to break their ego control and elicit information. But Bluebird lacked scientific knowledge and obedience; Dulles wanted Gottlieb to get it back on course. After proceeding through training, he was named chief of the newly formed Chemical Division of the Technical Services Staff (TSS). On August 20, 1951, Dulles ordered Bluebird to be expanded and centralized, and renamed the Project Artichoke, which quickly became a power base for Gottlieb. Dulles was promoted to Deputy Director of Central Intelligence days after intensifying Artichoke's scale. This assured protection and encouragement for all of Gottlieb's future mind-control projects from the highest levels of the U.S. government.

Dulles and Gottlieb both believed there was a way to influence and control the human mind that could lead to global mastery. They also wanted a "truth serum", something that had been investigated during the days of the OSS but never fully realized. Gottlieb conducted experiments using THC, cocaine, heroin, and mescaline before realizing LSD had not been properly tested or investigated by the agency. After trying LSD for the first time himself, Gottlieb accelerated LSD experiments at the agency, testing it on agents who agreed to be dosed under controlled environments and some who agreed to be dosed by surprise. LSD had been invented only a decade earlier, and few Americans knew it existed. After months of experimenting on agents and prisoners left Gottlieb unsatisfied, he sought help from the Special Operations Division at Detrick. With this agreement, the CIA acquired the knowledge and facilities of the Army to develop bioweapons suited for the CIA. 
  
Gottlieb's first 18 months at the agency led to some frustrating discoveries. The drugs he was experimenting with were not the "truth serums" he wanted them to be, and often hindered interrogations rather than aiding them. He knew Dulles, now the Director of Central Intelligence under President Eisenhower, would approve anything he wanted to do, and this increased his ambitions. He hatched a new idea that consumed Artichoke and gave him authority over all CIA research into mind control, including the ability to test drugs on witting and unwitting Americans, which was not being done under Artichoke. Gottlieb and Richard Helms, then-Chief of Operations for Directorate of Plans, wrote a memorandum to send to Dulles.

Dulles formally approved Project MKUltra on April 13, 1953. His brother, John Foster Dulles, was tapped for Secretary of State, giving even further diplomatic cover to the project. On April 10, Dulles described the program and others like it in a speech to alumni at Princeton University, referencing the new battlefield of "brain warfare" and the battle for controlling the human mind. He disguised his program by describing it as something the Soviet Union was doing rather than something he was pioneering himself. Gottlieb selected multiple researchers, scientists, and ex-OSS members to work for him under MK-ULTRA "Subprojects." Those contracted conducted experiments on Gottlieb's behalf and reported their findings to him. He sponsored physicians such as Donald Ewen Cameron and Harris Isbell in controversial psychiatric research including non consensual human experiments.

Gottlieb administered LSD and other hallucinogenic drugs to unwitting subjects and financed psychiatric research and development of "techniques that would crush the human psyche to the point that it would admit anything". He was named as the person who gave Army bacteriologist Frank Olson LSD at an MK-ULTRA retreat, leading to Olson's mental spiral and death a week later.

Gottlieb was the liaison to the military subcontractor Lockheed, then working for the CIA on Project AQUATONE, later known as the U-2 spy plane. In 1953, he arranged a safe house for the Lockheed Aeronautics Services Division (LASD) with an easy and exclusive egress.

By 1955 Project MK-ULTRA had outgrown its government funding. At this point Subproject 27 (basic research of LSD) was a funding subproject that combined previous subprojects, including payment to Sandoz Pharmaceuticals for LSD, John Mulholland's The Official CIA Manual of Trickery and Deception (subproject 15 magic support, Mulholland Supplement), and further procurement of LSD (subproject 18), but it grew to almost 150 documented subprojects, including a microwave gun and the search for alternatives to LSD, which led to later programs like Project MKCHICKWIT, most of which focused on South America.

In addition to working with subcontractors, the CIA worked with the Advanced Research Projects Agency (ARPA) of the Department of Defense and the Office of Naval Intelligence, though it is unclear what role Gottlieb played in these affairs other than authorization.

In March 1960, under The Cuban Project, a CIA plan approved by President Eisenhower—and under the direction of CIA Directorate for Plans Richard M. Bissell—Gottlieb proposed spraying Fidel Castro's television studio with LSD and saturating Castro's shoes with thallium to make his beard fall out. Gottlieb also hatched schemes to assassinate Castro, including the use of a poisoned cigar, a poisoned wetsuit, an exploding conch shell, and a poisonous fountain pen. Gottlieb also played a role in the CIA's attempt to assassinate Prime Minister Patrice Lumumba of the Congo. He took a vial of poison to the Congo with plans to place it on Lumumba's toothbrush in the summer of 1960. He transported these "toxic biological materials" to Larry Devlin, the CIA station chief in the Congo, and although Devlin declined the assignment, a military coup soon overthrew and killed Lumumba.

Retirement and death
Gottlieb retired from the CIA in 1973, saying he did not believe his work had been effective. Visited in retirement by the son of his late colleague Frank Olson, he was residing in an "ecologically correct" home in Culpeper, Virginia, where he raised goats, ate yogurt and advocated peace and environmentalism. He and his wife spent two years traveling Australia, Africa and India before settling down for several months to run a leper hospital in India. He had two sons and two daughters.

On October 7, 1975, Gottlieb testified before the Church Committee under the alias "Joseph Schneider." He did not reveal much in his testimony, besides saying he had destroyed nearly all records of what he did during his time at the agency. Gottlieb was never convicted of any crimes. Few historical studies mention his name.

On March 7, 1999, Gottlieb died at his home in Washington, Virginia. He was reported to have a history of heart problems, but his wife declined to give the cause of death.

See also

References

Further reading
 
Holley, Joe (2005, June 16). "John K. Vance; Uncovered LSD Project at CIA". Washington Post, Page B08.
Jacobs, John (1977, September 5). "The Diaries Of a CIA Operative". Washington Post, A1.
Kettle, Martin (2000, August 10). "President 'ordered murder' of Congo leader". The Guardian.
 
Marks, John (1991). The Search for the "Manchurian Candidate". W.W. Norton & Company, Inc.

People of the Central Intelligence Agency
1918 births
1999 deaths
Human subject research in the United States
Human rights abuses in the United States
Mind control theorists
Psychedelic drug researchers
Project MKUltra
Jewish American scientists
Recipients of the Distinguished Intelligence Medal
People from Washington, Virginia
American people of Hungarian-Jewish descent
20th-century American chemists
Scientists from the Bronx
Scientists from Virginia
San Jose State University alumni
University of Wisconsin–Madison alumni
Arkansas Tech University alumni
California Institute of Technology alumni
City College of New York alumni
20th-century American Jews